Entomogaster is a genus of beetles in the family Buprestidae, containing the following species:

 Entomogaster aequalipennis Obenberger, 1931
 Entomogaster amplicollis Fairmaire, 1900
 Entomogaster apollo Obenberger, 1946
 Entomogaster asperula Thery, 1905
 Entomogaster carli Thery, 1936
 Entomogaster descarpentries Thery, 1937
 Entomogaster funebris Thery, 1937
 Entomogaster grandis Thery, 1937
 Entomogaster griseofasciata Obenberger, 1946
 Entomogaster hoschecki Thery, 1937
 Entomogaster iris Obenberger, 1946
 Entomogaster kerremansi Fairmaire, 1899
 Entomogaster maculipicta Obenberger, 1931
 Entomogaster mandrakana Obenberger, 1946
 Entomogaster mocquerysi Thery, 1905
 Entomogaster modesta Fairmaire, 1899
 Entomogaster octoguttata (Kerremans, 1894)
 Entomogaster posticalis (Fairmaire, 1903)
 Entomogaster pumilio Obenberger, 1946
 Entomogaster sexpunctata (Gory & Laporte, 1839)

References

Buprestidae genera
Taxa named by William Wilson Saunders